Que Te Vaya Bien En Todo is the eighth studio album released by Los Mismos on August 12, 2003. It was the last album Los Mismos released for Univision Music Group. The band left because of the merger with Fonovisa, the label that supports Marco Antonio Solís.

Eusebio "El Chivo" Cortez made a second stint with the band.

Track listing

References

2003 albums
Los Mismos albums
Spanish-language albums